The year 2016 in art involves various significant events.

Events
March -  The Met Breuer opens in the former home of the Whitney Museum of American Art.

July 28 - The re-discovery of Albrecht Dürer's engraving Mary with Infant Jesus previously considered lost since World War II is reported. The engraving was noticed in good condition at a flea market in Sarrebourg and returned to Staatsgalerie Stuttgart.
September 30 - The recovery of two paintings by Vincent van Gogh, Seascape at Scheveningen and Congregation Leaving the Reformed Church in Nuenen, stolen in 2002, is announced.
November - The Albright-Knox Art Gallery in Buffalo, New  York simultaneously breaks ground on its new $160 million dollar expansion project (dubbed AK360) and closes until the undertaking's planned completion date of 2022. Funds raised for the new development include a $42.5 million dollar challenge grant given by Western New York native Jeffrey Gundlach, (the largest single gift ever to a Buffalo cultutsl institution and to which he later added a further $10 million dollar sum). When the museum reopens in 2022 it will be known as the Albright Knox Gundlach Art Museum.
December 19 - The Russian Ambassador to Turkey; Andrei Karlov is shot dead at point-blank-range in an act of political assassination (by Mevlüt Mert Altıntaş  who is believed to have been an off duty Turkish police officer) while giving a speech at an exhibition of Russian photographs at the Çankaya Contemporary Arts Center in Ankara.

Exhibitions
January 20 until April 17 - "In the Lion's Den: Daniel MacDonald, Ireland and Empire" at Ireland’s Great Hunger Museum at Quinnipiac University.
February 5 until April 27 - Peter Fischli David Weiss: How to Work Better" at the Solomon R. Guggenheim Museum in New York City.

February 18 until May 15 -  "O'Keeffe, Stettheimer, Torr, Zorach: Women Modernists in New York" at the Norton Museum of Art in West Palm Beach, Florida.
February 18 until June 13 - "Munch and Expressionism" at the Neue Galerie New York .
March 18 until September 4 - "Unfinished: Thoughts Left Visible" at the Met Breuer in New York City.
March 2 until June 5 - "Van Dyck: The Anatomy of Portraiture" at the Frick collection in New York City.
March 23 until July 10 - "Umberto Boccioni: Genio and Memoria (Genius and Memory)" at the Palazzo Reale in Milan, Italy.
March 26 until February 1, 2017 - "Alex Da Corte: Free Roses" at Mass MOCA in North Adams, Massachusetts.
April 27 until June 19 - "Andra Ursuta: Alps" at the New Museum in New York City.
May 7 until November 27 - "A Third Gender: Beautiful Youths in Japanese Prints" (curated by Asato Ikeda) at the Royal Ontario Museum in Toronto, Ontario, Canada then traveled to the Japan Society in New York City from March 10 until June 11, 2017.
May 27 until September 7 - "Moholy-Nagy: Future Present" at the Solomon R. Guggenheim Museum in New York City.
June 10 until September 25 - "Stuart Davis: In Full Swing" at the Whitney Museum of American Art in New York City.
June 18 until April 16, 2017 - "Tony Oursler: Imponderable" at MOMA in New York City.
June 28 until October 2 -"Francesco Clemente: Winter Flowers and the Tree of Life" at the Complesso Museale Santa Maria della Scala in Siena, Italy.
September 1 until October 23 - Bjork Digital at Somerset House in London.
September 2 until January 8, 2017 - "Hans Memling: Portraiture, Piety, and a Reunited Altarpiece at the Morgan Library in New York City.
September 16 until  January 2, 2017 - "Carmen Herrera: Lines of Sight" at the Whitney Museum of American Art.
September 30 until January 29, 2017 - "Los Angeles to New York: Dwan Gallery, 1959-1971" at the National Gallery of Art in Washington D.C.
October 7 until January 16, 2017 - "Valentin de Boulogne: Beyond Caravaggio" at the Metropolitan Museum of Art in New York City.
October 7 until January 11, "Agnes Martin" at the Solomon R. Guggenheim Museum in New York City.
October 19 until February 20, 2017 - "Max Beckmann in New York" at the Metropolitan Museum of Art in New York City.
October 25 - January 29, 2017  - "Kerry James Marshall : Mastry" at the Met Breuer in New York City.
October 26 - January 15, 2017 - "Pipilotti Rist: Pixel Forest" at the New Museum in New York City.
November 21 until March 16, 2017 - "Francis Picabia: Our Heads Are Round so Our Thoughts Can Change Direction" at MOMA in New York City.
December 15 until October 31, 2017 - "Dalí: Stereoscopic Images: Painting in Three Dimensions" at the Dalí Theatre and Museum in Figueras Spain.

Works
Alice Aycock - "Whirpools" at MGM National Harbor, Oxon Hill,  Maryland.
Kevin Beasley - *Who's Afraid to Listen to Red, Black and Green?" Morningside Park, New York City.
Mindaugas Bonanu and Dominykas Čečkauskas - "Make Everything Great Again".
Christo and Jeanne-Claude - The Floating Piers on Lake Iseo near Brescia, Italy. 
Coldwar Steve - McFadden's Cold War (Twitter feed begins March)
Michael Dean - United Kingdom poverty line for two adults and two children: twenty thousand four hundred and thirty six pounds sterling as published on 1st September 2016 (installation).
Jeremy Deller - We're Here Because We're Here (event staged across U.K. July 1).
Bob Dylan - "Portal" at MGM National Harbor Oxon Hill,  Maryland.
Eric Fischl - Late America
Lubaina Himid - Le Rodeur (series of paintings)
Carsten Holler - Slide addition to  Anish Kapoor's Arcelormittal Orbit at Queen Elizabeth Olympic Park in London, England.
Chul Hyun Ahn - "The Wells" at MGM National Harbor, Oxon Hill,  Maryland.
Martin Jennings -
Mary Seacole (sculpture, St Thomas' Hospital, London).
Women of Steel (sculpture, Sheffield, England).
Christian Marclay - "Chewing Gum".
Carolyn Palmer - Statue of Lucille Ball (sculpture, second and permanent replacement version, Celoron, New York).
Giuseppe Penone The Germination Series at the Louvre Abu Dhabi in Abu Dhabi, UAE.
Pikachu (anonymous sculptor, New Orleans, Louisiana).
Martin Puryear - Big Bling (exhibited and installed in Madison Square Park in Manhattan, New York City; later installed and exhibited at Mass MoCA in North Adams, Massachusetts).
Ugo Rondinone - "Seven Magic Mountains" commissioned by the Nevada Museum of Art and installed in the Nevada desert between the towns of Sloan and Jean.
Michal Rovner - Anubis.
Dana Schutz - Open Casket.
Matt Starr - Amazon Boy.
Vytautas Tomaševičius - A Still Life with Two Objects.
Jordan Wolfson - Colored Sculpture.

Awards
The Archibald Prize - Louise Hearman for "portrait of Barry Humphries"
The Hugo Boss Prize - Anicka Yi
The Hepworth Prize for Sculpture: Helen Marten
The John Moores Painting Prize - Michael Simpson for "Squint (19)"
Turner Prize: Helen Marten

Deaths
January 2 - Marcel Barbeau, 90, Canadian painter and sculptor
January 4 - Frank Armitage, 91, Australian-American artist for Walt Disney Studios 
January 6 - Uche Okeke, 83, Nigerian artist
January 10 
David Bowie, 69, British singer-songwriter, actor, visual artist, and art collector
Bård Breivik, 67, Norwegian sculptor
Cornelis Zitman, 89, Dutch born Venezuelan sculptor.
January 13 - Lois Weisberg, 90, Cultural affairs commissioner of Chicago (1988-2011)
January 14 - Sergio Vacchi, 90,  Italian painter
January 16 - Joannis Avramidis, 93, Georgian-born Austrian sculptor
January 17 
Melvin Day, 92, New Zealand artist 
Gottfried Honegger, 98, Swiss artist and graphic designer
January 25 - Thornton Dial, 87, American artist
February 11 - Charles Garabedian, 92, Armenian American painter
February 10 - Douglas Haynes, 80, Canadian painter
February 12 – Sossen Krohg, 92, Norwegian actor and theatre director
February 16
 Eugenio Carmi, 95. Italian painter and sculptor
 Bernard Kirschenbaum, 91, American artist
February 18 - Karl Stirner, 92, German-born American sculptor
March 3 - Tome Serafimovski, 80, Macedonian sculptor
March 4 - Pirro Cuniberti, 92, Italian artist
March 5 
Robert Redbird, 76, Native American artist
Panayiotis Tetsis, 91, Greek painter
March 10 - Anita Brookner, 87, British art historian and novelist 
March 11 - Rómulo Macció, 84, Argentine painter
March 19 - Bob Adelman, 85, American photographer
March 23 - Arie Smit, 99, Dutch-born Indonesian painter
March 31 - Zaha Hadid, 65, Iraqi born British architect
April 1 - André Villers, 85, French photographer
April 2 - Rick Bartow, 69, Native American artist
April 3 - Leopoldo Flores, 82, Mexican artist
April 11 - Anne Gould Hauberg, 98, American arts patroness
April 15 
A. A. Raiba, 94, Indian painter
Malick Sidibé, 80, Malian photographer (death announced on this date)
April 16 - Richard Smith, 84, British painter
April 24 
Inge King, 100, German born Australian sculptor
George Alexis Weymouth, 79, American artist and conservationist
April 28 - Charles Gatewood, 73, American photographer
April 30 - Marisol Escobar,  85,  French born American sculptor of Venezuelan descent
May 2 
Basil Blackshaw, 83-84, Northern Irish artist
 Karel Pečko, 95, Slovenian artist
May 4 - Carl Fredrik Reuterswärd, 81, Swedish artist "Non violence", (death announced on this date)
May 8 - Louisa Chase, 65, American painter
May 10 - François Morellet, 90, French painter, sculptor and light artist
May 19 - Hugh Honour, 88, British art historian
June 4 - Piero Leddi, 85, Italian painter
June 16 
Bill Berkson, 76, American poet and art critic
Giuseppe Spagnulo, 79, Italian sculptor
June 19 - Nicolás García Uriburu, 78, Argentine artist and landscape architect 
June 21 - Kenworth Moffett, 81, American art curator (first curator of contemporary art at the Boston Museum of Fine Arts), museum director (Museum of Art Fort Lauderdale) and writer
June 24 - Tony Feher, 60. American sculptor
June 25 - 
Bill Cunningham, 87, American photographer
Ben Patterson, 82, American Fluxus artist, musician 
July 6 - Shaw McCutcheon, 94, American editorial cartoonist  
July 15 - Janez Bernik, 82, Slovenian painter
July 18 
Billy Name, 76, American photographer
Mladen Stilinović, 69, Croatian artist
July 22 -
Bernard Dufour, 93, French painter
Evin Nolan, 86, Irish painter
July 23 - S.H. Raza, 94, Indian artist
August 9 - Ernst Neizvestny, 91, Russian-American sculptor (Mask of Sorrow), painter, graphic artist and art philosopher
August 31 - Nathan Lyons, 86, American photographer
September 4 - Ralph Goings, 88, American painter
September 13 - Gérard Rondeau, 63, French photographer
September 18 - Hassan Sharif, 65, Emirati artist
September 19 - Annie Pootoogook, 47, Canadian Inuit artist
September 29 - Shirley Jaffe, 93, American painter and sculptor
September 30 - Frederic C. Hamilton, 89, American oilman and arts philanthropist (Denver Museum of Art)
October 1 - Daphne Odjig, 97, Canadian First Nations artist
October 2 
Betty Blayton Taylor, 79, American artist, arts administrator and co-founder of the Studio Museum in Harlem
Walter Darby Bannard, 82, American painter
 Andrew Vicari, 84, British painter
October 4 
 Yusuf Arakkal, 70, Indian painter
Elaine Lustig Cohen, 89, American graphic designer
October 8 - Klaus Kertess, 76, American curator and gallerist
October 12 - David Antin, 84, American poet, critic and performance artist
October 31 - Silvio Gazzaniga, 95, Italian sculptor (FIFA World Cup Trophy)
November 3 - Misha Brusilovsky, 85, Russian artist
November 10 - Leonard Cohen, 82, Canadian poet, songwriter and artist
November 14 
 Diana Balmori, 84, American landscape designer
Marti Friedlander, 88, New Zealand photographer
November 16 - Myles Murphy, 89, English painter
November 28 - William Christenberry. 80, American artist
December 1 - Ousmane Sow, 81, Senegalese sculptor
December 20 - El Hortelano, Spanish painter
December 21 - Corno, 64, Canadian artist
December 22 
Kenneth Snelson, 89, American sculptor (Needle Tower, Six Number Two)
Lella Vignelli, Italian designer and co-founder of Vignelli Associates
December 23 - Tim Pitsiulak, 49, Inuk artist
December 29 - Judith Mason, 78, South African painter
December 30 - Tyrus Wong, 106, Chinese born American artist and film production illustrator (Bambi)

References

 
 
2010s in art
Years of the 21st century in art